Diethylstilbestrol disulfate (brand names Hydroestryl, Idroestril; former developmental code name M.G. 137) is a synthetic, nonsteroidal estrogen of the stilbestrol group and an ester of diethylstilbestrol (DES) that was formerly marketed but is now no longer available. It is described as an antineoplastic agent.

References

Estrogen esters
Hormonal antineoplastic drugs
Phenol esters
Sulfate esters
Synthetic estrogens